Image-Line Software (commonly known as simply Image-Line) is a Belgian software company best known for its digital audio workstation program FL Studio and related audio plugins such as Sytrus and Harmor. Image-Line was founded in 1994. In 2007, Image-Line introduced Deckadance, a virtual DJ console application. The company also produced EZGenerator, a template-based web editing program.

History

Early development
Image-Line was founded by Jean-Marie Cannie and Frank Van Biesen, who after seven years of creating stock market software for Pavell Software, decided in 1992 to branch into video games. Their first product was an adult video game based on Tetris, which they then offered on floppy disks in the ad section of Computer Magazine. Around this time CD-ROM games such as The 7th Guest were becoming popular, inspiring Van Biesen and Cannie to begin working with Private, one of the larger producers of adult video games at the time. Private released multiple Image-Line CD-ROM games including Private Prison and Private Castle. The company officially adopted the name Image-Line in 1994.

Didier "Gol" Dambrin
Around the time they released the games for Private, IBM launched the "Da Vinci" contest where the first prizes were color laptops. Image-Line, which at the time had little money, won the contest in the multimedia category after reworking one of their game environments to fit the contest criteria.

Image-Line took an interest in Didier "Gol" Dambrin, the developer who won the overall Da Vinci contest as well as the Game category. They hired the 19-year-old to work for them, and his first game for the company was the game Private Investigator.  Dambrin's next project for Image-Line was the platform game Eat This,  a shoot 'em up game that involved killing aliens.

Other Image-Line developers created products such as the invoicing program Fact2000 and E-OfficeDirect, a content-based web tool that would a precursor to their later product EZGenerator. Image-Line also topped the Belgian game charts 4 years in a row with their CD version of the Belgian TV game show Blokken.

Audio software
In 1997 Dambrin gained an interest in music applications of the time such as Hammerhead and Rebirth 338, and developed a simple MIDI-only drum machine in an effort to merge the two products into a step sequencer that utilized both rows and steps. Dubbed FruityLoops 1.0, the program didn't fit with Image-Line's other product lines of the time. However, the demo version released in December 1997 became so popular that the number of downloads quickly overwhelmed the Image-Line servers. To gather income to support their servers, Image-Line had Dambrin develop an EJay clone called FruityTracks. Image-Line then served as the program's OEM for Mattel. The program was released as Pro-DJ in France and the UK, and Radio 538 Music Machine in The Netherlands and Belgium.

Image-Line continued to develop the FruityLoops application from a simple drum machine into a large and complex digital audio workstation. FruityLoops was eventually renamed FL Studio for branding purposes and to avoid a prolonged trademark dispute in the United States with Kelloggs. FL Studio is now one of the most popular software production systems in the world, and Image-Line's flagship program. A multitude of plug-ins have been developed by Image-Line to work with FL Studio, including synthesizers such as Sytrus and effects plugins such as Maximus and Edison. In 2007 Image-Line released Deckadance, a DJ mixing program developed by programmer Arguru. Deckadance works as both a stand-alone program and as a FL Studio plugin.

Other software
Beyond audio products, Image-Line developed and distributed EZGenerator, a software program for website design and maintenance. EZGenerator has won multiple awards since its release.

Products

See also
FL Studio
FL Studio Mobile
Deckadance
EZGenerator
Sytrus

References

External links

FL Studio website
Deckadance website
EZGenerator website

Software companies of Belgium
Belgian companies established in 1994
Companies based in East Flanders